McKenzie Corey Dickerson (born May 22, 1989) is an American professional baseball outfielder for the Washington Nationals of Major League Baseball (MLB). He has played in MLB for the Colorado Rockies (2013–2015), Tampa Bay Rays (2016–2017), Pittsburgh Pirates (2018–2019), Philadelphia Phillies (2019), Miami Marlins (2020–2021), Toronto Blue Jays (2021) and St. Louis Cardinals (2022).

The Rockies selected Dickerson in the eighth round of the 2010 Major League Baseball draft, and he made his MLB debut in 2013. Dickerson was an MLB All-Star in 2017, and won a Gold Glove Award in 2018.

Amateur career
Dickerson was born in McComb, Mississippi, (population 13,000) and raised in Brookhaven, Mississippi. He attended Brookhaven Academy (with a student body of 400) in Brookhaven, where he played baseball and also starred in football and basketball. In his junior year, he injured his shoulder at a baseball camp, forcing him to move from shortstop to the outfield in baseball, and from quarterback to wide receiver in football. Dickerson holds the State Private School Association career and single-season records for home runs, with 45 over four seasons, and 15 his senior year. Also, his single-season .591 batting average and 55 runs batted in (RBIs) are both Brookhaven Academy records.

Dickerson later enrolled at Meridian Community College in Meridian, Mississippi, on a full baseball scholarship, where he played center field and was the leadoff hitter for the school's baseball team. During his freshman season at Meridian, Dickerson hit .459 with 21 home runs.

Professional career

Colorado Rockies
The Colorado Rockies drafted him in the 29th round in 2009, but he did not sign. The Rockies then selected Dickerson in the eighth round of the 2010 Major League Baseball draft.

In 2010 he played for Casper Ghosts in the Pioneer League, and batted .348(6th in the PCL)/.412(8th in the league)/.632(leading the league) with 54 runs (8th), 22 doubles (2nd), 9 triples (2nd), 13 home runs (tied for 3rd), and 61 RBIs (tied for the league lead) in 276 at bats. On September 6, 2010, he was a Pioneer League Player of the Week. In 2010 he was a Pioneer League postseason All Star, an MiLB Organization All Star, and a Topps Short-Season/Rookie All Star.

On June 3, 2011, while playing with the Asheville Tourists of the Class A South Atlantic League, Dickerson recorded 10 RBIs on three home runs. It was tied for the most RBIs in a single game in South Atlantic League history, a record that had stood for 33 years. On July 11, 2011, he was the SAL Player of the Week. In 2011 he batted .282/.356/.629(3rd in the SAL) with 78 runs (5th), 5 triples (tied for 10th), 32 home runs (leading the SAL), and 87 RBIs (tied for 3rd) for Asheville in 383 at bats and was an MiLB Organization All Star. He was fourth in the minor leagues in both home runs and slugging percentage in 2011.

In 2012, Dickerson played for the Tulsa Drillers of the Class AA Texas League, and for the Modesto Nuts of the California League. He batted a combined .304/.358/.542	with 22 home runs and 81 RBIs in 506 at bats. He was a California League mid-season All Star. He then played in the Arizona Fall League, where he batted .364/.368/.515 in 66 at bats and was named a Rising Star.

Prior to the 2013 season, MLB named him the 16th-best prospect in the Rockies system. In 2013 he batted .371(2nd in the PCL)/.414/.632(3rd) with 14 triples (leading the league), 11 home runs, and 50 RBIs in 315 at bats with Colorado Springs and was a PCL postseason All Star, and an MiLB Organization All Star.

The Rockies promoted Dickerson to the major leagues on June 21, 2013. Dickerson made his debut the next day at Nationals Park where he picked up his first two career hits, both doubles, and his first career RBI as the Rockies beat the Washington Nationals. On July 28, Dickerson hit his first career home run off Milwaukee Brewers pitcher Donovan Hand, in a Rockies victory. In 2013 in the majors he batted .263/.316/.459 with 5 home runs and 17 RBIs in 190 at bats.

Dickerson began the 2014 season with the Rockies, but was optioned to the Colorado Springs Sky Sox of the Class AAA Pacific Coast League on April 9 when Boone Logan was activated from the disabled list. On June 18, 2014, in a game versus the Los Angeles Dodgers, Dickerson was the only batter to reach base safely during Clayton Kershaw's no-hitter, reaching on an error. In 2014 in the majors, he batted .312(9th-best in the league)/.364/.567(3rd-highest in the NL) with 24 home runs, 18.2 at-bats-per-home-run (6th-best in the NL), and 76 RBIs in 436 at-bats.

Dickerson suffered two broken ribs while diving for a catch on June 30, 2015. In 2015 he batted .304/.333/.536 with 10 home runs and 31 RBIs in 224 at-bats.

Tampa Bay Rays

On January 28, 2016, Dickerson was traded, along with Kevin Padlo, to the Tampa Bay Rays for pitchers Jake McGee and Germán Márquez. In 2016, Dickerson's first season away from Coors Field, his batting line dropped to .245/.293/.469, as he hit a career-high 36 doubles (10th in the AL) with 24 home runs and 70 RBIs in 510 at bats. He spent most of his time as the DH and left fielder.

In 2017, Dickerson's play was completely transformed, and he hit in the leadoff spot. His turnaround led him to a .325/.367/.569 line with 17 home runs at the All-Star break, leading the DH position in nearly every category. His numbers led him to beat out incumbent Nelson Cruz for the starting DH spot in the All-Star Game, becoming the first Ray to start the game since 2010 (Carl Crawford, Evan Longoria, David Price). Dickerson's performance waned in the second half. Dickerson ended 2017 batting .282/.325/.490 with a career-high 27 home runs and 62 RBIs in 588 at-bats. He swung at 45.6% of pitches outside the strike zone (the highest percentage in the majors). On defense, his two double plays were the most by an American League left fielder, and his range factor/9 IP of 2.22 was second-best among AL left fielders.

Pittsburgh Pirates
The Rays designated Dickerson for assignment on February 17, 2018. On February 22, they traded him to the Pittsburgh Pirates for Daniel Hudson, Tristan Gray, and cash considerations. On April 26, Dickerson hit his first career walk-off home run, off of Alex Wilson. It was the only offense of the game as the Pirates won over the Tigers 1–0.

In 2018, Dickerson hit .300 (8th in the NL)/.330/.474 with seven triples (9th), 13 home runs, and 55 RBIs in 504 at-bats, and swung at 59.3% of all pitches he saw, tops in the major leagues. He had the highest fielding percentage among major league left fielders, at .996, the highest range factor/9 IP among NL left fielders (2.23), and had five double plays (most among NL outfielders) and seven assists (second-most among NL left fielders). He also earned his first career Gold Glove Award.

In 2019 with the Pirates, he batted .317/.376/.556 with four home runs and 25 RBIs in 126 at-bats.

Philadelphia Phillies
On July 31, 2019, the Pirates traded Dickerson to the Philadelphia Phillies for a player to be named later and international signing bonus money. At the time of the trade, he was owed $2.8 million of his annual $8.5 million salary for the final two months of the season.

In 2019 with the Phillies, he batted .293/.307/.579 with eight home runs and 34 RBIs in 133 at-bats. His season was cut short by a fractured navicular bone in his left foot.

Miami Marlins 
On January 6, 2020, Dickerson signed a two-year, $17.5 million contract with the Miami Marlins. In 2020, he had the lowest fielding percentage of all major league left fielders, at .970. On the offensive side, Dickerson slashed .258/.311/.402 with seven home runs and 17 RBI in 194 at-bats. In 62 games with Miami in 2021, Dickerson slashed .260/.321/.377 with two home runs and 14 RBI.

Toronto Blue Jays

On June 29, 2021, Dickerson was traded to the Toronto Blue Jays alongside Adam Cimber in exchange for Joe Panik and minor league pitcher Andrew McInvale.

St. Louis Cardinals
On March 18, 2022, Dickerson signed a one-year, $5 million deal with the St. Louis Cardinals. Over three games from August 23 to 25, Dickerson recorded 10 hits in 10 consecutive at-bats, giving him the longest such streak by a Cardinal in the expansion era.

Washington Nationals
On January 10, 2023, Dickerson signed a one-year, $2.25 million deal with the Washington Nationals.

Personal life 
Dickerson and his wife, Beth Anne, had a son in 2014. On February 22, 2018, the same day he was traded to the Pirates, the couple had their second son. In the offseason, Dickerson resides in Madison, Mississippi.

References

External links

1989 births
Living people
American League All-Stars
People from McComb, Mississippi
Baseball players from Mississippi
Major League Baseball outfielders
Gold Glove Award winners
Meridian Eagles baseball players
Colorado Rockies players
Tampa Bay Rays players
Pittsburgh Pirates players
Philadelphia Phillies players
Miami Marlins players
Toronto Blue Jays players
St. Louis Cardinals players
Casper Ghosts players
Asheville Tourists players
Modesto Nuts players
Tulsa Drillers players
Salt River Rafters players
Colorado Springs Sky Sox players
Indianapolis Indians players
Buffalo Bisons (minor league) players
People from Madison, Mississippi